Mae Raka is a subdistrict in the Wang Thong District of Phitsanulok Province, Thailand.

Geography
Mae Raka lies in the Nan Basin, which is part of the Chao Phraya Watershed.

Administration
The subdistrict is divided into 15 smaller divisions called (muban), which roughly correspond to the villages.  There are 14 villages, one of which occupies two muban. Mae Raka is administered by a Tambon administrative organization (TAO).  The muban in Mae Raka are enumerated as follows:

References

Tambon of Phitsanulok province
Populated places in Phitsanulok province